The Great Scenic Railway is a heritage-listed wooden roller coaster located at Luna Park Melbourne in Melbourne, Australia. The roller coaster is the oldest operating roller coaster in the Southern Hemisphere and the second-oldest in the world. The ride is one of only seven rollers coasters remaining that requires a brakeman to stand on the train.

History
The Great Scenic Railway opened in December 1912, making it the second-oldest operating roller coaster. The roller coaster is regarded as an ACE Classic Coaster. The Great Scenic Railway and Luna Park Sydney’s Wild Mouse are the only two operating wooden roller coasters in Australia.

Characteristics
A brakeman is required in order to brake the roller coaster.

The roller coaster has three trains with two cars. Each car can sit up to 10 riders. Each train weighs about 2 tonnes.

Ride experience
The roller coaster begins by entering a cable lift hill. It then reaches its highest point. The ride starts with a few large drops and goes through a series of small structures. The ride then goes through a series of smaller drops.

See also
 Leap-The-Dips - oldest operating roller coaster in the world
 List of heritage-listed buildings in Melbourne

References

Roller coasters in Australia
Roller coasters introduced in 1912
Heritage-listed buildings in Melbourne
St Kilda, Victoria
Wooden roller coasters
Amusement rides introduced in 1912
Roller coasters with brakemen
Buildings and structures in the City of Port Phillip